Patriarch Athanasius of Alexandria may refer to:

 Athanasius of Alexandria, Patriarch of Alexandria in 328–373 or 328–339 and 346–373
 Patriarch Athanasius II of Alexandria, Patriarch of Alexandria in 490–496
 Patriarch Athanasius III of Alexandria, Greek Patriarch of Alexandria in 1276–1316
 Patriarch Athanasius IV of Alexandria, Greek Patriarch of Alexandria in 1417–1425